Ibrahim Harun (born 1974) is the current chairman of the Red Sea Afar Democratic Organisation (RSADO)  and was the First Vice Chairman of the organisation, from 1999 to 2001.

Founding RSADO
Harun became a part of the struggle in 1999, when he abandoned his economics studies in Addis Ababa and left for Abala, Ethiopian Afar Regional State, joining the first conference of the Red Sea Afar People to establish the Red Sea Afar Democratic Organisation (RSADO).
In the conference, he was elected vice chairman of the RSADO.

Head of RSADO
After the death of Ali Osman Ma'ar on 12 April 2001, Harun was chosen to succeed to the post of Chairman of RSADO.

References

1974 births
Living people
Eritrean Muslims
Eritrean politicians
Ethiopian politicians